The Solomon Islands national football team represents the country of Solomon Islands in international association football. It is fielded by Solomon Islands Football Federation, the governing body of football in Solomon Islands, and competes as a member of the Oceania Football Confederation (OFC), which encompasses the countries of Oceania. Solomon Islands played their first international match on 30 August 1963 in a 3–1 loss to New Hebrides in Apia.

Solomon Islands have competed in numerous competitions, and all players who have played in at least one international match, either as a member of the starting eleven or as a substitute, are listed below. Each player's details include his playing position while with the team, the number of caps earned and goals scored in all international matches, and details of the first and most recent matches played in. The names are initially ordered by number of caps (in descending order), the by date of debut, then by alphabetical order. All statistics are correct up to and including the match played on 30 March 2022.

Key

Players

References

Solomon Islands international footballers
Association football player non-biographical articles